Kyren Williams (born August 26, 2000) is an American football running back for the Los Angeles Rams of the National Football League (NFL). He played college football at Notre Dame.

Early life and high school
Williams grew up in St. Louis, Missouri and attended St. John Vianney High School. Williams rushed for 922 yards and 22 touchdowns and also had 51 receptions for 774 yards and 12 touchdowns in his junior season. As a senior, Williams rushed for 2,035 yards and 26 touchdowns caught 55 passes for 725 yards and was named the St. Louis Metro Area Offensive Player of the Year and also recorded 92 tackles, eight tackles for loss, five sacks and eight interceptions on defense. Williams was rated a three-star recruit and committed to play college football at Notre Dame over offers from Michigan, Michigan State, Stanford and Wisconsin.

College career
Williams joined the Notre Dame Fighting Irish as an early enrollee. As a true freshman, he played in the first four games of the season before sitting the rest of the year in order to preserve an extra year of eligility, rushing for 26 yards on four carries and catching one pass for three yards. Williams was named Notre Dame's starting running back going into his sophomore year. He was named the Atlantic Coast Conference Running Back of the Week for the first week of the season after rushing 19 times for 112 yards and two touchdowns while also catching two passes for 93 yards. Williams finished the season with 1,125 rushing yards and 13 touchdowns on 211 carries while also catching 35 passes for 313 yards and one touchdown and was named second-team All-ACC, the ACC Offensive Rookie of the Year, and the overall ACC Rookie of the Year. On December 10, 2021, Williams declared for the 2022 NFL Draft.

Statistics

Professional career 

Williams was selected by the Los Angeles Rams in the fifth round (164th overall) of the 2022 NFL Draft. On June 7, 2022, it was announced that Williams had suffered a broken foot in practice and had undergone surgery.

He was placed on injured reserve on September 13, 2022. He was designated to return from injured reserve on October 26, 2022. He was activated from injured reserve on November 12, 2022.

NFL career statistics

References

External links

 Los Angeles Rams bio
 Notre Dame Fighting Irish bio

2000 births
Living people
American football running backs
Notre Dame Fighting Irish football players
Players of American football from St. Louis
Los Angeles Rams players